Paleorhopalosoma is an extinct genus of wasps in family Rhopalosomatidae.

Taxonomy
The genus contains the following species:
Paleorhopalosoma menatensis Nel, Azar & Hervet, 2010

References

Rhopalosomatidae
Hymenoptera genera
Extinct Hymenoptera
Paleocene arthropods
Fossil taxa described in 2010

Prehistoric insect genera